Eka Gei Sokari (Polyandry with Sokari) is a 2020 Sri Lankan Sinhala drama film directed by Jackson Anthony and produced by Creative Helanka (Pvt) Ltd. It stars Udari Warnakulasooriya and Akhila Dhanuddara in lead roles along with Sajitha Anthony and Wilson Gunaratne. Music composed by Chinthaka Jayakody.

The movie is based on an ancient Lankan marital tradition known as Eka gei Kaema (means "fraternal polyandry") as well as dance tradition Sokari. The soundtrack of the film was released in January 2020 at Savoy Theaters, Wellawatte.

Plot
The story dated back to 1930s prior to Soulbury constitutional reforms. In a rural hilly village called Akiriyankumbura in Wellassa, a beautiful girl, Sedera Menike (played by Udari) is protected by her two brothers Dingira and Dungura. However, she secretly fall in love with a rebel from Monarawila lineage, Monara (played by Akila). Meanwhile, a young and energetic Sokari dancer and a folk singer called Baalaya (played by Sajitha) starts to flirt around Sedera Menike and cousin sister Dalumalee (played by Senali). The film revolves about the relationships among Sedera Menike, Monara and Baalaya.

Cast
 Udari Warnakulasooriya as Sedera Menike
 Akhila Dhanuddara as Monara 
 Sajitha Anthony as Baalaya 
 Wilson Gunaratne
 Terry Jayasinghe
 Ruwan Perera as Dheerananda Thero 
 Senali Fonseka as Dalumalee 
 Ariyaratne Kaluarachchi
 Sampath Tennakoon
 Susila Kottage
 Ruwan Wickremasinghe
 Lalith Rajapaksha
 Ivan Anthony

References

External links
 
  Eka Gei Sokari Movie Songs - Anuraga Sokari on YouTube

2020s Sinhala-language films
Sri Lankan drama films
2020 drama films